Chilahuala is a small town in Bolivia. In 2001 it had a population of 220.

References

Populated places in La Paz Department (Bolivia)